John Keith Matthews (7 March 1934 – 2008) was a Welsh professional footballer who played as a winger. He made appearances in the English Football League for Wrexham in the 1950s, and also played in the Welsh leagues for Llay United and Blaenau Ffestiniog.

References

1934 births
2008 deaths
Welsh footballers
Association football wingers
Wrexham A.F.C. players
Blaenau Ffestiniog Amateur F.C. players
English Football League players